This is a list of people from Enid, Oklahoma.

Academics
 Melissa Dell - Economics professor, Harvard University, winner of the John Bates Clark Medal

Actors and actresses

 Richard Erdman - actor, Stalag 17, Community
 Glenda Farrell - actress
 Lynn Herring - actress, General Hospital, Days of Our Lives
 Thad Luckinbill - actor, star of The Young and the Restless
 Russell Scott - Blinky the Clown, Blinky's Fun Club

Artists

 Gene Havlick - Academy Award-winning film editor
 Paladine Roye - Ponca artist
 James B. Shackelford - cinematographer
 Lyndon Stromberg - sculptor
 Mark Enger - painter
 Matt Enger - painter

Athletes

 Kody Bliss - CFL
 Todd Franz -  2005 NFL player, Green Bay Packers
 Don Haskins - Naismith Basketball Hall of Fame coach of 1966 NCAA Champion Texas Western Miners, subject of book and movie "Glory Road."
 Ray Hayward - Major League Baseball pitcher
 Andrew Hoxie - USSF soccer player
 Steve Fuller - NFL
 Lou Kretlow - Major League Baseball pitcher
 Chris McCubbins - Olympian, runner
 Ken Mendenhall - NFL
 William E. "Pinky" Newell - athletic trainer, Purdue University, a founder of the National Athletic Trainers' Association
 Stacy Prammanasudh - LPGA
 Brent Price - NBA
 Mark Price - NBA
 Rip Radcliff - Major League Baseball outfielder
 Lil Stoner - Major League Baseball pitcher, also played for Champlin Oilers
 John Ward - NFL
 Jeff Zimmerman  - NFL

Architects
 Karl Kamrath - architect and tennis player

Authors

 Don Blanding - poet, author
 Walter Bowart - author, psychedelic drug advocate
 J. Quinn Brisben - poet, socialist presidential candidate
 Wade Burleson - author and historian
 Angie Debo - author, historian, teacher at Enid High School
 Jon Franklin - author, two-time Pulitzer Prize winner
 Carol Hamilton - Poet Laureate of Oklahoma, 1995-1997
 Marquis James - author, two-time Pulitzer Prize winner
 Louis Jenkins - poet
 D.L. Lang - Poet Laureate of Vallejo, California
 Quraysh Ali Lansana - poet, civil rights historian
 Mark Potts - Pulitzer prize winning journalist and filmmaker
 Betty Lou Shipley - Poet Laureate of Oklahoma, 1997-1998
 Bess Truitt - Poet Laureate of Oklahoma, 1945-1946

Business owners
 Sherman Billingsley - founder and owner of the Stork Club in New York City
 Sam Boyd - casino owner
 Clyde Cessna - aviation pioneer,  aircraft manufacturer
 Harold Hamm - owner of Continental Resources and Hiland Partners; billionaire

Criminals
 Daniel Holtzclaw - serial sexual assault under color of authority as Oklahoma City police officer

Musicians and singers

 Vida Chenoweth - first professional solo classical marimbist 
 Karen Dalton - singer, musician
 Casey Grillo - drummer for power metal group Kamelot
 Michael Hedges - guitarist
 Mark Kelly - bassist for Petra
 Leona Mitchell - opera singer
 Brad Richter - classical guitarist
 Sam Rivers - jazz musician
 Matthew Schultz - musician, Pigface, Lab Report
 Mark Selby - musician
 Don Yule - opera singer with the New York City Opera

Television and radio personalities
 Glenn Hauser - DXer
 Sharron Miller - Emmy Award and Directors Guild of America Award winning television director, producer, writer.
 Harold Taft - television meteorologist

Politicians and military figures

 Patrick Anderson - Oklahoma State Senator
 Page Belcher - Oklahoma US representative
 Robert M. Blair - Medal of Honor recipient
 James Yancy Callahan - Oklahoma Territorial delegate to the US House of Representatives
 John Newbold Camp - Oklahoma US Representative
 Bud Cummins - United States Attorney
 Frank Frantz - Seventh Oklahoma Territorial Governor
 Milton C. Garber - Oklahoma US representative; editor of Enid News & Eagle
 Owen K. Garriott - astronaut
Jerauld R. Gentry - Air Force test pilot
 Bo Gritz - former US Army Special Forces operator; political activist
 Stephen Jones - attorney
 Harold Kiner - Medal of Honor recipient
 Norman Lamb - Oklahoma Secretary of Veterans Affairs
 Todd Lamb - Lt. Governor of Oklahoma
 E. Bay Mitchell - Judge, Oklahoma Court of Civil Appeals
 Kenneth M. Taylor - USAF general, Pearl Harbor hero
 Leon Vance - Medal of Honor recipient
 George H. Wilson - Oklahoma US representative

Religious figures
 Yahweh Ben Yahweh (Hulon Mitchell Jr.) - founder, Nation of Yahweh
Wade Burleson - American minister

Scientists
 Paul H. Allen - botanist

Other
 Letitia Chambers - director of the Heard Museum

References

See also
List of mayors of Enid, Oklahoma

Enid
Enid, Oklahoma